Ram Kumar Verma was the Rajya Sabha member for Rajasthan, he is a retired Reserve Bank of India official. He secured 40 votes and won the seat.

References

Rajya Sabha members from Rajasthan
Living people
Bharatiya Janata Party politicians from Rajasthan
Year of birth missing (living people)